Ussy-sur-Marne (literally Ussy on Marne) is a commune in the Seine-et-Marne department in the Île-de-France region in north-central France.

Demographics
Inhabitants of Ussy-sur-Marne are called Ussois.

Notable people
 André the Giant (1946–1993), professional wrestler and actor
 Samuel Beckett (1906–1989), Irish playwright who lived and worked in France, owned a house in the village

See also
Communes of the Seine-et-Marne department

References

Communes of Seine-et-Marne